Autoroute 440 (or A-440) is a superhighway located in Quebec City. It includes two separate segments, respectively named Autoroute Charest and Autoroute Dufferin-Montmorency. Originally meant to be connected and form a single continuous highway via a tunnel under the city centre (unused ramps were torn down at the western terminus of the Dufferin-Montmorency section in the late 2000s), these plans were shelved years ago and are not expected to be revived.

The designation of Autoroute Charest is derived from Boulevard Charest, which is the street continuation east of this segment of A-440.

Route description
It begins at the junction of A-73 and A-40 and ends at Saint-Sacrement Avenue. Originally built as a two-lane freeway in 1962, it was twinned in 1967.

The roadway continues as Boulevard Charest into downtown Quebec, where A-440 traffic is directed along Rue Monseigneur-Gauvreau to reach the Autoroute Dufferin-Montmorency at its westernmost interchange (exit 21).

It begins at Route 175 (Corner of Avenue Dufferin and Côte d'Abraham) and ends at the junction with A-40 in Beauport. The portion from Route 175 to Boulevard Henri-Bourassa. (Exit 23) was built in 1976 and the rest of the segment (Exits 23 to 29) was built in 1982.

The autoroute was designated Dufferin-Montmorency because it extends former Avenue Dufferin (now Avenue Honoré-Mercier) in Quebec City and ends near the Montmorency Falls in Beauport. Lord Dufferin was a Governor General of Canada and had significant ties to Quebec City.

Exit list

References

External links 

A-440 at Quebec Autoroutes
 Transports Quebec Map 

40-4 Quebec City
Streets in Quebec City